Bee Branch is a stream in Chariton County in the U.S. state of Missouri. It is a tributary of the Chariton River.

Bee Branch most likely was named for frequency of honeybees along its course.

See also
List of rivers of Missouri

References

Rivers of Chariton County, Missouri
Rivers of Missouri